Olustee is an unincorporated community in Baker County, Florida, United States.  The name "Olustee" is from the nearby Olustee Creek whose name derives from the Creek (Muscogee) language ue-lvste (/oy-lást-i/) meaning "black water".  The town was historically known as Olustee Station and is the location of the Olustee Battlefield Historic State Park and of the ranger station for the Osceola National Forest, which is headquartered there.  The US Forest Service has restored the former railroad depot at the center of town as a visitor center and museum for forest visitors.

Geography
Olustee is located at  (30.20389, -82.42889).

References

External links
 Baker County Florida Community Home Page

Unincorporated communities in Baker County, Florida
Unincorporated communities in the Jacksonville metropolitan area
Unincorporated communities in Florida